Philippe Blanchard (born 8 December 1968), known professionally as Philippe Katerine, is a French singer-songwriter, actor, director and writer who began his career in 1991. Some of his popular singles include "Mon cœur balance", "Je vous emmerde", and "Louxor j'adore".

At the beginning of his career, his musical style was sometimes associated with the easy-listening movement by offering music with bossa nova accents accompanied by texts often morbid or anguished and tinged with humor, all sometimes interspersed with audio collages. He also turned to rock, a little bit of electronic music without ever setting aside to be part of the quirky French song. In 2010, he attracted people’s attention as an actor by lending his features to Boris Vian in the biopic Gainsbourg, A Heroic Life, from Joann Sfar. The following year, he was put forward with being the headliner in the offbeat comedy, I am a No Man's Land. In 2015, he played head of state in Gaz de France.

At the same time, he essentially became known as a quirky second role from French comedies: La Tour 2 contrôle infernale (2016), by Éric Judor, Hibou (2016), by Ramzy Bedia, We Are Family (2016), by Gabriel Julien-Laferrière, Le Petit Spirou (2017), by Nicolas Bary, Sink or Swim (2018), by Gilles Lellouche, and The World is Yours (2018), by Romain Gavras.

At the 44th César Awards, he received the César Award for Best Supporting Actor for his performance in Sink or Swim.

Success as singer-songwriter in the 1990s
In November 1991, Katerine began his career. In 1992, he released Les Mariages Chinois, a first re-released album with an additional title, under the title Les Mariages chinois et la Relecture. Anxious and very unsure of his work, Katerine composes and records almost alone at home.
 
In 1994, he released the album L’Education anglaise on which his sister (under the pseudonym Bruno) and his girlfriend Anne are singing. He begins to be recognized, out of the commercial circuit.
 
In 1995, he worked on his third album and had an important evolution during a year. He opens to other musicians and sings his own lyrics. The album Mes mauvaises fréquentations comes out in 1996 and takes on a bigger dimension thanks to a richer orchestration and several voices. The album, which is very well received by the public and critics, is followed by a tour. He also works on the album of Mercedes Audras that will be released in 1996 and for which he is, for the first time, a director.
 
In 1997, he composed an album for two Anglo-Japanese singers, the Winchester Sisters and also participated in a disc where he met the jazz musicians of the group The Recyclers, with which he will work thereafter. He composes in parallel L’homme à trois mains and Les créatures. The first is interpreted and recorded as usual, only at home with derisory means, while the second is with the Recyclers, in more "conventional" conditions. The two albums are edited together and mark a real turning point in the career of Philippe Katerine.
 
He then plays the game of media and promotion, and the title Je vous emmerde is broadcast on the radio. The Recyclers who come from a different world fascinate him by their way of working and their relationship to improvisation. Katerine believes that this collaboration has allowed him to integrate new ways of working, and to integrate improvisation into his work method.

In 1999, he composed Une histoire d’amour for Anna Karina. A triumphal tour follows with his favorite actress, a tour during which a tribute evening to Anna Karina is organized by the Cinémathèque de Vendée in La Roche-sur-Yon, with the presence of the actress and the Vendée singer. The two artists then give a mini-concert before watching with the public the films Pierrot le fou of Jean-Luc Godard and Vivre ensemble of Anna Karina. He satiated his passion for cinema by participating in several films.

Personal life
He has a daughter, Edie (born in 1993). He has two sons, Billy (born 16 June 2011) and Alfred (born 8 August 2012), with Julie Depardieu.

Discography

Studio albums
 Les mariages chinois (1991)
 Les mariages chinois et la relecture (1993)
 L'éducation anglaise (1994)
 Mes mauvaises fréquentations (1996)
 Les Créatures (1999)
 L'homme à trois mains (1999)
 8ème ciel (2002)
 Robots après tout (2005)
 Philippe Katerine (2010)
 52 reprises dans l'espace (2010)
 Magnum (2013)
 Le film (2016)
 Confessions (2019)

Live albums
 Border Live + Studio Live (2007)
 Florilège (2018)

Notable singles

 Comme Jeannie Longo (1993)
 Un après-midi à Paris (1994)
 Le manteau de fourrure (1995)
 Entre nous (1996)
 Je vous emmerde (1999)
 L'homme à 3 mains (1999)
 Jésus Christ mon amour (2000)
 Des étoiles (2002)
 Mort à la poésie (2003)
 1 Rue Jacquemot (2004)
 Euro 04 (Katerine & Helena Noguerra) (2004)
 Louxor j'adore (2006)
 100% VIP (2006)
 78-2008 (2007)
 Le grand sommeil (Étienne Daho & Katerine) (2009)
 Extra Terrestre (Arielle Dombasle & Katerine) (2009)
 La banane (2010)
 Té-lé-phone (remixes by Stromae & The Shoes) (2010)
 Sexy Cool (2013)
 Efféminé (2014)
 Moment parfait (2016)
 Compliqué (2016)
 Y'a d'la rhumba dans l'air (2017)
 85 Rouge et noir (Katerine & MC Circulaire) (2018)

Filmography

Actor

Director/Writer

Composer

References

External links

 
 Official website

1968 births
Living people
People from Vendée
French male singers
French film directors
French male screenwriters
French screenwriters
French male film actors
21st-century French male actors
Rennes 2 University alumni